Zahabiya Sufism (Zahabiya Silsila) is a Shiite Sufi order. The chain history of dervishes of this order is attributed to the third century AH to Ma'ruf al-Karkhi. Some believe the origin of the order dates back to the ninth century AH in Iran and this sect became popular first in Khorasan and then in Shiraz in the early Safavid period.

History
The Zahabiya order is a Sufi sect of the Shiites of the ninth century AH, composed of followers of Seyyed Abdullah Borzeshabadi Mashhadi. In Iran, after the formation of the Safavid state, this sect spread and then many sects branched out from it. For this reason, it is also called "Umm al-Salasel" (mother of the branches). The root of the Zahabiya order is from the Sufis of "Kubrawiya of Hamadani". In a word, Zahabiya is a Silsila (chain, lineage of sheikhs) of the Tariqa (school, order) of Kubrawiya. Some have considered Zahabiya to be Sunni before Borzeshabadi, after him they have considered it as a Shiite tendency.

The founder
There are three views about the founder of the Zahabiya order:

A more authentic narrative
According to some narrations, Khajeh Eshaq Khuttalani (who was the Qutb of Kubrawiya order at the time), sees in a dream the extraordinary characteristics of one of his young disciples named Muhammad Nurbakhsh Qahistani and not only makes him his successor (leaves the cloak of Mir Sayyid Ali Hamadani to Muhammad Nurbakhsh Qahistani) but also introduces him as the Mahdi (savior of the world). Khajeh Eshaq Khuttalani entrusts the responsibility of his followers to Muhammad Nurbakhsh Qahistani, but one of them, Seyyed Abdullah Borzeshabadi, refuses to obey him and leaves the area. At that time, Khajeh Eshaq Khuttalani says: "Zahaba Abdullah" means Abdullah is gone. Hence, the way that Seyyed Abdullah Borzeshabadi took became known as "Zahabiya", as a branch of Kubrawiya order.

Qutb

Sufis believe that the seeker should follow the one who leads him and the so-called Sufi should choose a mentor. This guide is called by different names such as "Pir" (elder), "Wali" (guardian), "Sheikh" (lord, master) and "Qutb" (the universal man, the center, the axis). The definition of "Qutb" states: Qutb is a person who is the place of sight of God Almighty; A special sight of the whole world at any time and that Qutb is like the heart of Muhammad (prophet of Islam). Qutb is also called "Abdul Elah" (servant of the God).

Asadullah Khavari writes in introducing Qutb from the point of view of Zahabiya: "The meaning of the Qutb in Zahabiya view is perfect men and partial saints who have attained degrees and perfections through conduct and divine passion, and after the stage of annihilation [of the Ego], revived by God and they have reached the degree of the understanding of the immediate guardian of God and the owner of time, who is the Qutb of all Qutbs of the time."

Qutb genealogy of Zahabiya
In the appendices of the book "Tohfeh Abbasi", the names of the Qutbs of the Zahabiya order are mentioned in the following order:

Qutb of Nateq - Samet
In the Zahabiya order, the Qutb of the time - which is the current leader of Zahabiya - is called "Qutb-e Nateq" (the rhetorical Qutb) and his successor called "Qutb-e Samet" (the silent Qutb) during the life of "Qutb-e Nateq". These terms are one of the specific terms of the Isma'ilism sect that some use in Sufism.

Different names
The name Zahabiya is the most famous name of this sect in absolute terms and without any restrictions, and various aspects have been mentioned for naming it. But Zahabiya is known by other names too, such as Elahieh, Mohammadiyyah, Alawiyah, Razaviyyah, Mahdieh, Marufiyah, Kubrawiya, and Ahmadiyya. Of course, for each of these names, a mode is stated. For example, the new name of Ahmadiyya, which is derived from the name of Mirza Ahmad Abdulhay Mortazavi Tabrizi (known as Vahid al-Owlia, 37th Qutb of Zahabiya), has recently been added by the devotees of him to the former names of the Zahabiya order.

Mohammad Ali Moazzen Khorasani (29th Qutb of Zahabiya) mentions "Umm al-Salasel" (mother of the branches) as one of the names of Zahabiya and writes: In Iran, after the formation of the Safavid dynasty and the promotion of the Shiite religion, only the Zahabiya order, which was specific to the Shiites, expanded; And for this reason, it is also called Umm al-Salasl; Because over the last few centuries, many branches have been formed of it.

Reason for naming
Regarding the reason for naming this order as "Zahabiya" (means Golden), it has been said that the heads (Qutbs) of this order have the science of alchemy of the soul; For this reason, the seeker under their care becomes spiritually refined and becomes like pure gold. Their rule is that until the seeker reaches this level of purity, he/she cannot guide anyone. Another reason mentioned is that there was no Sunni person in this sect and their elders and guardians all were Twelver. Another reason is that the Hadith of Golden Chain considered as the authenticity of this sect.

Claims and reviews

 So far, many claims and researches have been made about the authenticity of Zahabiya genealogy, some of which are mentioned here:

 Attribution of the Zahabiya order to The Fourteen Infallibles: The followers of the Zahabiya order believe that the origin of this sect is reach to Imam Reza (8th Imam of Shiites) through Ma'ruf al-Karkhi. Imam Reza also leads to the Holy Prophet Muhammad (prophet of Islam) through his ancestors.
 Ma'ruf al-Karkhi was from Karkh of Baghdad and one of the famous mystics. He born 750–60 CE and died according to many researchers, in the year 815 CE (200 AH). Elsewhere it is said about him: The height of his perfection was such that fourteen sect branched out from him, which are known as the Marufiyah sects. The disagreement that exists about Ma'ruf al-Karkhi is his connection and meeting with Imam Reza and his converting to Islam; Some believe that he met with Imam Reza and converted to Islam by him; Ibn al-Husayn al-Sulami claims in the book Tabaqat al-Sufiah that Ma'ruf al-Karkhi converted to Islam through Imam Reza. Ali Hujwiri writes: Ma'ruf al-Karkhi converted to Islam by Imam Reza and was very dear to him. Ibn Khallikan in the book Wafyat al-A'yan, in addition to mentioning Ma'ruf al-Karkhi converting to Islam by Imam Reza, has considered him as one of the Imam's patrons. According to some sources, after Ma'ruf al-Karkhi became a Muslim and returned to his parents, who were Christians, they also converted to Islam. Elsewhere, Ma'ruf al-Karkhi has been introduced as the special gatekeeper of Imam Reza. It is also said about the cause of Ma'ruf al-Karkhi's death: After converting to Islam, he was the gatekeeper of Imam Reza. One day, due to the crowd at the house of Imam, Ma'ruf al-Karkhi was defeated and died as a result. Attar of Nishapur writes in the book Tazkirat al-Awliya that Ma'ruf al-Karkhi fell ill after that bone fracture and then died. And in some sources it is stated that after that fracture, he was disabled for the rest of his life.
 Contrary to this view, others believe that there is no connection between Ma'ruf al-Karkhi and Imam Reza. In this regard, evidence and proofs has been mentioned; Including: The story of the conversion of Ma'ruf al-Karkhi to Islam and his responsibility as gatekeeper was narrated by Ibn al-Husayn al-Sulami for the first time without presenting a document, and others who have mentioned this story after him have narrated this story in the form of a messenger. In none of the books of  that have dealt with the biography of each of the companions and patrons of the Imams, the name of Ma'ruf al-Karkhi has not been mentioned. Ayatollah Borqei writes: "There is no name of "Ma'ruf al-Karkhi" in the books of Shiite rijals and his condition is unknown and not even a single hadith from him - neither in the principles of religion nor in the ancillaries - has been narrated by the Imams through him and some of the hadiths attributed to him are undocumented and has no evidence." Mohammad-Baqer Majlesi writes in this regard: "Ma'ruf al-Karkhi" is not known to have served "Imam Reza" and to say that he was the gatekeeper of the Imam is of course wrong; Because all the servants and patrons of that Imam from Sunni and Shiite have been recorded in the books of our rijals and the fanatical Sunnis who used to travel and narrate the hadith of that Imam have mentioned their names, if this man was the patron of that Imam, of course they quoted." Crowds at the door of the Imam Reza's house to the extent that a person is trampled by the crowds, is not compatible with the fact that the Imam was under the surveillance and harassment of Al-Ma'mun and the enemies always prevented the movement of Shiites with the Imams. According to all Sufi scholars, it is not possible to transfer the position of Qutb and the position of caliphate to the next Qutb during the life of the Imam who is the Qutb of the time. Imam Reza passed away in 818 CE (203 AH). And it was mentioned that Ma'ruf al-Karkhi, according to the famous opinion, died in the year 815 CE (200 AH); Therefore, Ma'ruf al-Karkhi was not Qutb during his lifetime; Because, as mentioned, it is not possible for two rhetorical Qutbs to converge at the same time. So even though he was not a Qutb, how can the Sufis consider him as their guide and claim that he gave cloaks to people (gave authority), such as Sari al-Saqati, and conveyed their dynasty to him? After the death of Imam Reza, Ma'ruf al-Karkhi was not alive to be the Qutb of the time. It is stated in historical books: Al-Ma'mun, the Abbasid Caliph, summoned Imam Reza to Merv in the year 815 CE (200 AH). And the movement of Imam Reza to Merv was through Basra, Ahvaz and Fars, and the reason for the Imam's passage through this route was that because the two cities of Qom and Kufa were Shiites and believed in Ahl al-Bayt, passing through these two cities caused a great deal of welcome for Imam Reza and a revolt against the agents of Al-Ma'mun. Morteza Motahhari also writes: The route that "Al-Ma'mun" chose for "Imam Reza" was a specific path that did not pass through the Shiite-settled locations; Because they were afraid of them. "Al-Ma'mun" Ordered not to bring the Imam through Kufa, to bring him to Nishapur through Basra, Khuzestan and Fars. On the other hand, before the year 815 CE (200 AH), there was no mention of a trip to Baghdad for Imam Reza and he had lived Medina until that year and Ma'ruf al-Karkhi did not leave Baghdad until the end of his life. Therefore, it is not possible that Ma'ruf al-Karkhi converted to Islam by Imam Reza; Because Imam Reza did not travel to Baghdad before the year 815 CE (200 AH), nor did Ma'ruf al-Karkhi travel to Medina to make a visit.

 Because the followers of the Zahabiya order attribute their authenticity to Imam Reza through Ma'ruf al-Karkhi, they believe Imam Reza has narrated the Hadith of Golden Chain in Nishapur, for this reason, this sect became known as "Zahabiya" (Golden).
 First, as mentioned, Ma'ruf al-Karkhi attribution and relationship with Imam Reza is a matter for reflection. Secondly, the Hadith of Golden Chain is a proof of the guardianship that Imam Reza received from his noble father and entrusted to his son Imam Jawad, not something that he supposedly gave to Ma'ruf al-Karkhi. In addition, there is no logical connection between this hadith and naming "Zahabiya".

 Another claim is that in the Zahabiya order there was no Sunni person and all its elders and guardians were of the Twelver religion and their guidance authenticity reaches the Infallible Imam, unlike other orders that are confused and mixed. For this reason, they became known as "Zahabiya" (Golden); Because, like pure gold, they are free from the disagreement and enmity of the family of Muhammad (prophet of Islam).
 This statement does not correspond to reality; Because most of the Qutbs of this sect were Sunni; In particular, regarding the religion of some of them (such as Junayd Baghdadi, Ahmad Ghazali, Abul Qasim Gurgani, Abubakr Nassaj Toosi and Abu al-Najib Suhrawardi), it has been proven that they are not Twelver.

 The seekers of this order, through their Qutbs, their existential copper turns into pure gold and they became free from the belongings of materialism and the temptation of the ego, and until they reach this level, they will not be allowed to be guide in the conduct of God.
 This claim is not true for all members of this sect; Because some of the Qutbs or followers of this sect have moral problems, political or social problems and have been caught in the temptations of Satan. And some of the Zahabiya's Qutbs have tended towards the deviant population of Freemasonry. Another case that seems to be more in line with reality is that when Seyyed Abdullah Borzeshabadi rebelled and disobeyed the order of his master - Khajeh Eshaq Khuttalani - to pledge allegiance to Muhammad Nurbakhsh Qahistani, because of this act of him, Khajeh Eshaq Khuttalani said: "Zahaba Abdullah" (it has two means: "Abdullah is gone" & "Abdullah became gold") and for this reason, this sect was formed and named "Zahabiya" (Golden). But the fact that sometimes this sect named "Zahabiya Eqteshashiah" (means Anarchy Zahabiya) is that the Sufis called the sectarian unrest without the permission of the sect's current leader as "Eqteshash" (Anarchy), and if it led to the formation of other independent sects, they introduce it as a baseless and unreliable sect by suffix of "Eqteshashiah" (Anarchy).

The path of growth of ZahabiyaAsadullah Khavari has divided the history of eleven and a half centuries of the Zahabiya order - from the time of death of Ma'ruf al-Karkhi (1st Qutb of Zahabiya) in 815 CE (200 AH) to the death of Jalaleddin Mohammad Majdolashraf Shirazi (36th Qutb of Zahabiya) in 1913 (1331 AH) - into five periods:

Walayah of Qamariya
The Zahabiya order has divided the Walayah or religious guardianship into two parts:
The Walayah of the whole: "Shamsiya" (sun)
The Walayah of the part: "Qamariya" (moon)
According to the beliefs of the Zahabiya order, the Walayah of the whole -"Shamsiya" (sun)- belongs to the Islam Prophet and his twelve descendants. And the Walayah of the part -"Qamariya" (moon)- belongs to the Sufi elders and Qutbs. Since all beings in the universe have to reach the levels of perfection and humanity through a perfect human being, and now that Mahdi is in the occultation, a person who has the Walayah of the part -"Qamariya"-, achieved and gained light from the existence of Mahdi, he is always present among the beings of the universe, and like the moon that reflects the light of the sun, purifies the mirror of the heart and illuminates the world, and for this reason, he is the instructor of the lunar world and obtains light from the sun (this means that in the absence of Mahdi, he is in charge of spiritual leader). They believe that the authenticity of the Walayah of the part -"Qamariya"- of this sect reaches Imam Reza through Ma'ruf al-Karkhi and the authenticity of the Walayah of the whole -"Shamsiya"- leads to the Islam Prophet through Imam Reza and his ancestors.

Exaggeration and esotericism
Some believe that the Zahabiya order believed in exaggeration (ascribe divine characteristics to figures of Islamic history) and in addition believe in esotericism and say that the inside of the Quran can be easily understood from its appearance. Zahabiya interprets the appearance without any analogy. They say that the heart of the mystic is the spiritual house of God and the Masjid al-Haram is the apparent house.

Monastic ceremony
The Zahabiya order, like other Sufi sects, is associated with monastic ceremonies in places called Khanqah. One of these ceremonies is the cloak giving of the Qubs, which is transferred from the current Qutb to the next Qutb. Another tradition of Zahabiya is Sama (listening include dancing). Another of their traditions is the culture of mastership and discipleship, which is very common among the followers.

Geography
The Zahabiya order first originated in Greater Khorasan and the Khuttal region, which was the center of the Qutbs and elders of the Kubrawiya order, especially Mir Sayyid Ali Hamadani and Khajeh Eshaq Khuttalani. This regions was the center of Zahabiya's Qutbs in the ninth to eleventh centuries AH. After many years, the center of the Zahabiya order moved to Shiraz and during the time of 30th Qutb (Najibuddin Reza Tabrizi), their center moved to Isfahan. And during the reign of Sultan Husayn, due to the pressure of the Islamic jurists, their centers were moved back to Shiraz. This sect also has followers outside of Iran and their activities have continued to nowaday.

Criticisms
There have been many criticisms of this sect and its beliefs, including:

 The formation of the Zahabiya order took place on the rebellion and disobedience of Seyyed Abdullah Borzeshabadi on the orders of his master Khajeh Eshaq Khuttalani, based on allegiance to Muhammad Nurbakhsh Qahistani, and this is the first coup in this sect.
 The followers of this sect connect their line of Qutbs to Imam Reza (8th Imam of Shiites) through Ma'ruf al-Karkhi and attribute themselves to The Fourteen Infallibles, while there is evidence that there was no connection between the Imam and Ma'ruf al-Karkhi.
 The followers of this sect claim that all the sects of this genealogy were Shiites, while the Sunni nature of some of their sects has been proven.
 The discussion of the dividing the Walayah and Walayah of the part -"Qamariya"- and its succession is full of problems and irrational.
 With the incorrect plan of dividing the Walayah into the Walayah of the whole -"Shamsiya"- and the Walayah of the part -"Qamariya"-, they consider their Qutbs to be the Walayah of Qamariya, but they do not have any evidence from the Quran verses and hadiths.
 Having religious guardianship or Walayah of the Qutbs is not compatible with the intellectual and moral deviations of some of these Qutbs.
 By dividing the Walayah into the Walayah of the whole -"Shamsiya"- and the Walayah of the part -"Qamariya"-, they consider their Qutbs and elders as super human and in a position above all human beings.
 They have been generalized the Walayah, its impossible in Shia Islam. This is while the Zahabiya order claims to be pure and Shiite.
 The hadiths they cite to prove their authenticity are very weak and often invalid.
 In the attribution of the Qutb, there are several cuts in the genealogy of this sect and it has not Qutbs in different historic periods for several years, while according to them, the existence of a Qutb is obligatory at any time.
 This sect is an anarchy sect (Eqteshashiah) and its history is very vague and unreliable.
 According to the Islamic narrations, Sufism was not approved by Imam Reza, so how does Zahabiya'', which is from Sufism, connect with Imam Reza?
 Examining the claims of this sect, it turns out that many superstitions have entered the case.
 Some believe that they do not care about Islamic worship and have introduced tastes in the religion.

Gallery

See also

References

External links
 Zahabiya in safavaid era
 The Emergence of the Ẕahabiyya in Safavid Iran

Sufism
Shia Muslims